Belize National Dance Company (also known as the Belize Dance Company) is a Belizean cultural preservation organization which strives to represent Belize and its many ethnic groups in classical, contemporary and traditional folk dancing.

History
In October 1990, the Belize National Dance Company was founded by a group of dancers which included Rosita Baltazar, Eleanor Bodden-Gillett, Joel Cayetano, Lydia Harris (now Thurton), Bernard Matute, Matthew Martinez, Liza Pagayo, Rodney Peck, Sharette Perotte, Norman Rodriguez, Althea Sealy and Ramon Vargas. Initially, their trainer was Cuban professor Edwardo Rivero, who came to Belize to help teach ballet and contemporary styles. The company incorporated local folk dancing into their performance pieces, which represent the major ethnic groups of the country including Caribbean, Creole, Garifuna, Hispanic Belizean, Mayan and Middle Eastern folk dances.

Since 2010, the Company's Managing Director has been Denese Enriquez, artistic director is Althea Sealy, and for many years the assistant artistic director and director of junior branches was Rosita Baltazar. In 1998, the San Pedro Dance Company  followed two years later by The Caye Caulker Dance Company were formed as junior dance organizations. 

The initial group of 16 dancers expanded to around 80 dancers and has traveled throughout the world including performances in the Caribbean, Costa Rica, France, Malaysia, Mexico, Spain and the United States. They present two annual performances in Belize one around the time of the Company's anniversary and one around the time of spring break, typically allowing six months of preparation between performances. As well as performing, the Company is a school of dance, and dancers also choreograph routines for other cultural events throughout the country.

References

Sources 

1990 establishments in Belize
Contemporary dance companies
Folk dance companies
Belizean culture
Organisations based in Belize